The Lycée Français de Manille is an international school in Parañaque, Metro Manila, Philippines. It is located on the European International School (formerly Eurocampus) in Better Living, Parañaque, Metro Manila, Philippines.

History
Founded in 1973 in Metro Manila, the French School of Manila (LFM) - formerly French School of Manila.

Signed on 22 January 1963 by General de Gaulle and Chancellor Adenauer , the Elysée Treaty defined the organization and principles of cooperation between France and the Federal Republic of Germany in the fields of Foreign Affairs, Defense, Education and Youth.

The Eurocampus project was born in 1992 under the leadership of several French personalities in the Philippines: Olivier Gaussot, Ambassador of France, Alain Chancerelle, Louis-Paul Heussaff and Philippe Gauthier. They formed the group of founding members of this ambitious Franco-German project, the first in the world.

Eurocampus 
The French High School in Manila (LFM) and the German European School Manila (GESM) are two partner schools, united within the Eurocampus, and jointly using the buildings and services. The courses are independent, each school being attached to the respective supervisory authority for each of the two institutions, but each day cooperating on mutual agreements.

References

Manila
International schools in Metro Manila
Schools in Parañaque